Angonyx krishna, the southern dark-green hawkmoth, is a moth of the family Sphingidae. The species was first described by Ulf Eitschberger and Jean Haxaire in 2006. It is found in southern India and Sri Lanka.

References

krishna
Moths described in 2006
Moths of Asia